The women's solo artistic swimming competition at the 1998 Asian Games in Bangkok was held on 13 December and 14 December at the Thammasat Aquatic Center.

Schedule
All times are Indochina Time (UTC+07:00)

Results

References

External links 
Results

Solo